Fyodor Ivanovich Kozhevnikov (15 March 1903 – 22 March 1998) was a Soviet jurist and legal expert.

He wrote extensively about international law aspects in Russian history, and his writing supported Russian nationalist interpretation rather than Marxist–Leninist ideas. His main argument was that the Russian state, both in Tsarist times as well as under the Soviets, was the most progressive civilization in the field of international law.

Legal career
During World War II, Kozhevninkov served as the Dean of the Law School at Moscow University. From 1952 to 1953 represented his country at the International Law Commission. In November 1953, was appointed as judge at the International Court of Justice, a position he held until 1961. He also served as a judge at the Permanent Court of Arbitration.

Works (partial list)
 Mezhdunarodnyi Dogovor [International Agreements] (Moscow, 1947)
 Russkoe Gosudarstvo i Mezhdunarodnoe Pravo (do XX Veka) [The Russian Government and International Law (until the 20th Century] (Moscow, 1947)
 Sovetskoe Gosudarstvo i Mezhdunarodnoe Pravo 1917–1947 gg [The Soviet Government and International Law 1917-1947] (Moscow, 1948)
 Velikaia Otechestvennaia Voina Sovetskogo Soiuza i Nekotorye Voprosy Mezhdunarodnogo Prava [The Great Patriotic War of the Soviet Union and Certain Questions of International Law] (Moscow, 1954)
 Kurs Mezhdunarodnogo Prava [A Course in International Law] (Moscow, 2nd edition, 1966)

Notes

External links
 Lauri Mälksoo, "The History of International Legal Theory in Russia: a Civilizational Dialogue with Europe" European Journal of International Law, Vol. 19 no. 1
 Boris Meissner, Soviet Concepts of Peace and Security

1903 births
1998 deaths
20th-century jurists
People from Smolensk
Communist Party of the Soviet Union members
International Court of Justice judges
International Law Commission officials
Members of the Permanent Court of Arbitration
Academic staff of the Moscow State Institute of International Relations
Academic staff of Moscow State University
International law scholars
Soviet judges of international courts and tribunals
Soviet judges of United Nations courts and tribunals
Recipients of the Order of Friendship of Peoples
Recipients of the Order of the Red Banner of Labour
Russian jurists
Soviet jurists
Burials at Donskoye Cemetery
Members of the International Law Commission